Cyril IV (died 8 February 1572) was the Metropolitan of Moscow and all Rus' from 1568 to 1572. He was the fourteenth Metropolitan in Moscow to be appointed without the approval of the Ecumenical Patriarch of Constantinople as had been the norm.

There is not much information on Metropolitan Cyril and his deeds. In 1566, Cyril was appointed archmandrite at the Troitse-Sergiyeva Lavra. On 11 November 1568 he was elected metropolitan in favor of the recently deposed Metropolitan Philip. During Cyril's term, Ivan the Terrible's fierceness reached its climax. In 1571, a Crimean Khan Devlet I Giray attacked Moscow and ravaged the city. Metropolitan Cyril had to hide in the Cathedral of the Dormition in the Moscow Kremlin to avoid death. It was Cyril who had asked Ivan IV not to execute Ivan Mstislavsky, accused of bringing the Tatars to the capital.

Metropolitan Cyril died on 8 February 1572 and was interred at the Novinsky Monastery.

1572 deaths
Metropolitans of Kiev and all Rus' (Patriarchate of Moscow)
Year of birth unknown
16th-century Eastern Orthodox bishops